The Sekban-ı Cedid Army was a brief and unsuccessful attempt (29 August – 18 October 1808) by Alemdar Mustafa Pasha to revive the Nizam-ı Cedid Army, based on European models. The attempt failed as the Janissaries revolted and killed Alemdar Mustafa Pasha. The Sekban-ı Cedid was abolished and all the privileges of the traditional Kapıkulu corps, to which the Janissaries belonged, were renewed.

Bibliography 
Armies of the Ottoman Empire 1775–1820

References

Military history of the Ottoman Empire
Military units and formations of the Ottoman Empire
Reform in the Ottoman Empire